Sumner has been the name of four ships in the United States Navy. The destroyers, DD-333 and DD-692, were named after World War I Marine Corps Captain Allen Melancthon Sumner. The survey ships, AGS-5 and T-AGS-61, were named after the 19th century Navy captain Thomas Hubbard Sumner.

 The first  was a  commissioned in 1921 and decommissioned in 1930.
 The second  was originally the submarine tender Bushnell; commissioned in 1915, converted to a survey ship in World War II, and a participant in the nuclear tests at Bikini Atoll; decommissioned in 1946.
 The third , the lead ship of her class, was an  commissioned in 1944 and decommissioned in 1973.
 The fourth  is a  that became operational in 1997.

United States Navy ship names